Daniel Corrie (10 April 1777 – 5 February 1837) was an English Anglican priest and bishop, the inaugural Bishop of Madras.

Corrie was born at Ardchattan, Argyll, Great Britain, the second son of John Corrie, a vicar in Lincolnshire. He was educated at St Catharine's College, Cambridge, ordained a deacon of the Diocese of Lincoln on 13 June 1802 and ordained a priest on 10 June 1804. He became Archdeacon of Calcutta in 1823. He was consecrated bishop in 1835 and died on 5 February 1837. The Times later reported that he had been taken ill at an SPG meeting on 31 January 1837.

Gallery

References

Further reading
Corrie, Daniel (1856) Familiar Letters; from Daniel Corrie, a military chaplain in the service of the East India Company, to a subaltern officer in the same service. The writer was subsequently advanced to the Bishopric of Madras. Cockermouth: Printed for private circulation only, at Bailey's office.
Corrie, Daniel et al. (1847) Memoirs of the Right Rev. Daniel Corrie; compiled chiefly from his own letters and journals, by his brothers, George Corrie and Henry Corrie. London: Seeley, Burnside, & Seeley
MacNaghten, Angus (1969) Daniel Corrie, his Family and Friends. London: Johnson 

19th-century Anglican bishops in Asia
Alumni of St Catharine's College, Cambridge
Anglican bishops of Madras
Archdeacons of Calcutta
1778 births
1837 deaths
British expatriates in India